Josefsdal on the R40 road in Mpumalanga is a border crossing between South Africa and Eswatini. The Eswatini side of the border post is known as Bulembu. The border is open between 08:00 and 16:00

References

Eswatini–South Africa border crossings